William Guthrie (February 22, 1884 – December 7, 1954) was an Ontario farmer and political figure. He represented Lambton West in the Legislative Assembly of Ontario as a Liberal member from 1934 to 1943.

He was born in Point Edward, Ontario, the son of Archibald Guthrie, and was educated in Sarnia Township. On November 6, 1907 he married Ida May Dunford. They had seven children. He was a market gardener. Guthrie defeated Andrew Robinson McMillen to win the provincial seat in 1934. He was defeated by Harry Steel in 1943. He died in 1956.

References

External links 

Lambton County's Hundred Years, 1849 - 1949, V Lauriston (1949)

1884 births
1954 deaths
Ontario Liberal Party MPPs
People from Lambton County